Vasileia is a village in Kyrenia District of Cyprus. It is located 3 km west of Lapithos. De facto, it is under the control of Northern Cyprus. Its population in 2011 was 2,091.

In the heart of Vasileia there is an abandoned church.

Culture, sports, and tourism
Turkish Cypriot Karşıyaka Sports Club was founded in 1957, and now in Cyprus Turkish Football Association (CTFA) K-PET 2nd League.

References

Communities in Kyrenia District
Populated places in Girne District
Greek Cypriot villages depopulated during the 1974 Turkish invasion of Cyprus